Lieutenant-General Sir Edward Arthur Fanshawe,  (4 April 1859 – 13 November 1952) was a British Army general of the First World War, who commanded the 11th (Northern) Division at Gallipoli and the V Corps on the Western Front during the Battle of the Somme, the Third Battle of Ypres, and the 1918 German spring offensive. He was the second eldest of three brothers who rose to command divisions or corps during the war.

Background and family
Fanshawe was born in 1859, the son of the Reverend Henry Leighton Fanshawe, of Chilworth, Oxfordshire. He attended Winchester College and the Royal Military Academy, Woolwich, then joined the Royal Artillery in 1878. He was the eldest of three brothers with significant military careers; Hew (b. 1860) joined the cavalry and Robert (b. 1863) joined the infantry, all three rising to command corps or divisions during the First World War.

He married Rose Higginson, daughter of Sir James Higginson, in 1893; they had three sons.

Early career
Fanshawe was commissioned as a lieutenant in the Royal Artillery on 31 January 1878. He served in the Second Anglo-Afghan War in 1878-80 and the Sudan expedition of 1885, following which he was promoted to captain on 17 March 1886. After promotion to major on 5 March 1896, he was in charge of a battery of the Royal Horse Artillery (RHA) during the Second Boer War. He stayed in South Africa until after the end of this war, and in November 1902 left Port Natal on the SS Ortona with the O Battery RHA, bound for Lucknow in the Bengal Presidency. Rising steadily through the ranks, he was promoted to lieutenant-colonel in 1903, and colonel in 1908. In 1909 he was appointed to command the artillery in one of the regular divisions garrisoned in Ireland; whilst serving there, he was personally commended by the King for saving an artilleryman from being crushed by a cavalry parade in Dublin. In 1913, he was transferred to command the divisional artillery in the Wessex Division of the Territorial Force.

First World War

At the outbreak of the First World War in August 1914, Fanshawe remained with the Wessex Division when it mobilised. The division was earmarked for service in India; however, before it sailed, Fanshawe was ordered to the Continent to join the British Expeditionary Force, where he became the Commander, Royal Artillery for 1st Division. He succeeded N. D. Findlay, who had been killed by shellfire on 10 September at the Battle of the Marne. He remained with the division through the winter of 1914–1915.

He was promoted to major-general and recalled home in mid-1915 to command the newly formed 31st Division of the New Army, but was transferred in August to take over the 11th (Northern) Division, which had been sent to Gallipoli in the Mediterranean. He remained with the division through the evacuation of the Dardanelles until, shortly after it arrived in France in July 1916, he was promoted to command V Corps. The corps had previously been commanded by his younger brother Hew, until he had been removed from command as a result of political manoeuvering following the failure of the Actions of St Eloi Craters in late March 1916.

V Corps was holding a position in the Ypres salient at the time Fanshawe took command, but in August it was transferred south, to support the Somme Offensive. In the final phase of the Somme fighting, at the Battle of the Ancre in November, he commanded an attack which captured Beaumont Hamel, one of the initial objectives of the offensive more than three months earlier. He was knighted the following year.

He remained with the corps through 1917, where it fought at the Third Battle of Ypres, and into 1918, where it began the year holding an exposed salient on the boundary between Third and Fifth Armies. It was heavily attacked in Operation Michael, the first phase of the German spring offensive of March 1918, and both it and the neighbouring VII Corps were forced to retreat, leaving a gap in the British lines. The responsibility for this was a matter of historical dispute for some decades, but the response at the time was unambiguous; both Fanshawe and the commander of VII Corps, Walter Congreve, were removed from command.

In August 1918 he was appointed to command XXIII Corps, and shortly thereafter transferred to command the garrison on the Firth of Forth, a posting which he held until after the end of the war.

Retirement

He was formally confirmed in the permanent rank of lieutenant-general in 1919, and retired from the Army in 1923. He then served in the ceremonial position of colonel commandant of the Royal Artillery from 1923 to 1929, and of the Royal Horse Artillery from 1930 to 1934.

Notes

References
 "FANSHAWE, Lieut.-Gen. Sir Edward Arthur", in 
 Obituary in The Times, 19 November 1952, p. 10
 
 
 

|-
 

|-
 

|-
 

|-
 

|-
 

|-
 

|-

1859 births
1952 deaths
British military personnel of the Second Anglo-Afghan War
Military personnel from Oxfordshire
British Army lieutenant generals
British Army generals of World War I
Knights Commander of the Order of the Bath
People educated at Winchester College